Mike Wilson (born December 4, 1951) is an American politician and a Republican member of the Kentucky Senate representing District 32 since January 4, 2011. He has served as the Senate Majority Whip since 2018. He is also a veteran of the US Marine Corps.

Education
Wilson earned his AA from Fullerton College and his BA in business administration from California State University.

Political career
In 2010, to challenge District 32 appointed Democratic Senator Mike Reynolds, Wilson won the three-way May 18, 2010 Republican Primary with 5,025 votes (51.5%) and won the November 2, 2010 General election with 18,935 votes (55.0%) against Senator Reynolds. From November, 2016 to November, 2017, Wilson was one of the most frequent travellers among state legislators.

References

External links
Official page at the Kentucky General Assembly

Mike Wilson at Ballotpedia
Mike Wilson at OpenSecrets

1951 births
Living people
California State University alumni
Fullerton College alumni
Republican Party Kentucky state senators
Politicians from Bowling Green, Kentucky
People from New Albany, Mississippi
United States Marines
21st-century American politicians